Ghetla Vasa Taku Nako is an Indian television series depicting epic stories and tales of Chaturmas, Bhagavat Purana, Vishnu Purana narrated by Atulshastri Bhagre and Charudatta Aphale Gurujis. It premiered on 8 March 2021.

Plot

Mahashivratri special

Story of Chandrabhan
Guruji narrates the tale of Chandrabhan, an ardent devotee of Lord Shiva. The story begins when Goddess Parvati throws her divine stole on earth to test Chandrabhan. The money lenders wife's adamance endangers Chandrabhan and his wife's life. Chandrabhan unknowingly ends up worshipping Lord Shiva when he goes to kill a deer, just then he faces new trouble. Chandrabhan aims to kill the deer who arrives at the pond to save Amba. However, he gets distressed on hearing each one's plight and sets them free. Later, he sees Lord Shiva's 'Pind' under a tree. The money lender punishes Chandrabhan who returns empty handed. Goddess Parvati accepts that Chandrabhan is a true worshipper and her stole saves him and Amba. Shiva-Parvati appear before the couple.

Story of Handful Milk
Bhagre Guruji tells the tale of a woman who is a strong believer in God. While the King's strange behaviour troubles the people in his kingdom, a sage gives a curse to the kingdom due to his rudeness. The sage's curse causes draught in the kingdom and the people starve. On learning about this, the queen decides to meet the sage. Later, Mai gives a 'Bhakari' to the thief who breaks into her house. The queen goes to a sage to find counter-measures for the curse. Accordingly, the king asks his people to donate milk for the ‘Pind’. Mai refuses to give all the milk. When the King punishes Mai, she asks for a bowl of milk, that she wishes to give Lord Shankar, as her last request. Seeing the miracle after the bowl is kept, the King realises his mistake.

Bhanu Saptami special 
Bhagre Guruji narrates the tale of 'Bhanu Saptami Vrata'. Indumati, a courtesan, comes across Maharaj Samar at a riverside. After being ill-treated by Sardar Kumar, she worships god for a good husband. Queen Kanchanmala tells Maharaj her decision of personally welcoming her mother. Later, Queen Kanchanmala gets furious when Sardar Kumar tells her that Maharaj is in Indumati's palace. When Indumati confesses that she loves Maharaj Samar, Lallan makes her aware of the reality. She appeases Maharaj Samar by making his favourite cuisine. Kanchanmala questions Maharaj Samar over Indumati.

Episodes

Reception 
The show is airing on Zee Marathi from 8 March 2021 at 6:30 pm by replacing Majhya Navryachi Bayko. Due to COVID-19 pandemic in Maharashtra, the show was stopped on 24 April 2021 and it again restarted from 16 August 2021.

Special episode (1 hour) 
 18 April 2021

References

External links 
 Ghetla Vasa Taku Nako at ZEE5
 

Indian epic television series
Marathi-language television shows
Zee Marathi original programming
2021 Indian television series debuts
2022 Indian television series endings